The following are association football events in the year 1895 throughout the world.

Events

Clubs founded in 1895
Camberley Town F.C.
Dundela F.C.
Eintracht Braunschweig
FC St. Georg Hamburg
Fortuna Düsseldorf
Pine Villa F.C. (Oldham Athletic A.F.C.)
R. Daring Club Molenbeek
Shelbourne F.C.
Thames Ironworks (West Ham United)
Yeovil Town F.C.

National champions
Argentina: Lomas Athletic Club
England: Sunderland
France: Standard Athletic Club
Ireland: Linfield
Scotland: Scottish Cup, St Bernard's F.C.

International tournaments
1895 British Home Championship (March 9 – April 6, 1895)

Births
11 February – Maurice Cottenet, French footballer
11 April – Jack Bamber, British footballer
23 May – Paul Baron, French footballer
31 August – Ben Verweij, Dutch footballer (d. 1951)
10 September – Jean Batmale, French international footballer (died 1973)
13 November – Jan de Natris, Dutch footballer (d. 1972)
7 Dezember – Karl Flink; German international footballer (d. 1958)
Antonio Bruna, Italian footballer
Édouard Baumann, French footballer
Félix Romano, Italian footballer, naturalized French citizen

References 

 
Association football by year